Shafqat Ali is a Canadian politician who was elected to represent the riding of Brampton Centre in the House of Commons of Canada in the 2021 Canadian federal election.

Prior to being elected, Ali was a real estate professional.

On May 9, 2022, Ali apologized to the House of Commons for attending the House of Commons virtually from a toilet stall.

References

Living people
1960s births
Businesspeople from Ontario
Liberal Party of Canada MPs
Members of the House of Commons of Canada from Ontario
Politicians from Brampton
Canadian real estate agents
21st-century Canadian politicians